Gloucester Advocate is an English language newspaper published in Gloucester, New South Wales, Australia.

Newspaper history
The Gloucester Advocate was founded by Frank Townshend. Townshend was from a family of journalists and newspaper printers, and had previously been involved with the setting up of newspapers in Cape Town, New Zealand, Newcastle and the Walcha Witness in Balgowlah, New South Wales, which he edited and printed for over 40 years. Townshend arrived in Gloucester in 1905 to commence a paper there, and released the first issue of Gloucester Advocate on 8 July. This corresponded with the time that Australian Agricultural Company's 500,000 acre estate was being subdivided. After a short time, Townshend sold the newspaper to the Rye family in October 1906.

The Rye family managed the newspaper for 57 years, until they sold it to Manning River Times Pty Ltd in June 1964.

Digitisation
The paper has been digitised as part of the Australian Newspapers Digitisation Program project of the National Library of Australia.

See also
List of newspapers in Australia
List of newspapers in New South Wales

References

External links
 

Newspapers published in New South Wales
Newspapers on Trove